The Naval Strategic Forces Command ( reporting name: NSFC), is one of the three major unified commands of the Pakistan Armed Forces responsible for the defence and protection of naval and naval-nuclear assets in the country. The command was commissioned on 24 June 2004, at Naval Headquarters (NHQ) after the concept was approved by then-Chief of Naval Staff Admiral Shahid Karimullah. The Naval Command is responsible for operational planning, directives, and deployment of nuclear weapons on its naval vessels.

The Naval Command provides vision, leadership, doctrinal guidance, resources and oversight to ensure component naval special operations forces are ready to meet the operational requirements of combatant commander. It is a vital part of the Pakistan Strategic Forces Command, and directly reports to Joint Chiefs of Staff Committee.
The Commanders of the NSFC Command ranges from senior flag officer of Rear Admiral to Vice Admiral rank depending on assignment nature.

Military overview

Operational rationale

Since 1999, the Navy had been considering the proposal of establishing the nuclear and military communication command after witnessing the successful operations of the PAF's Strategic Command.   Furthermore, during the heights of the border war with India in 1999, the country's strategic delivery system was not operational; something that would have put Pakistan under serious disadvantage if the conflict went nuclear.

After the 9/11 attacks in the United States and the subsequent United States' military actions in Afghanistan changes the strategic policy on the larger dependence on the navy as the large portion of the Pakistan military engages in Western fronts. The idea of "Second strike" was now swiftly shifted to navy guidance as early as in 2001. Furthermore, the navy also realized the importance of having a robust naval force and decided to commit greater resources for its development; consequently, tactics and strategic planning of PN also underwent a shift.

The work on establishing the command as started in 2000 under the command of Chief of Naval Staff Shahid Karimulla strongly advocated for the pursuit of idea of "Second strike".  Admiral Karim rationalized that "since the Navy had been considering the deployment of nuclear weapons aboard its submarines; it had to keep pace with developments in India." Although, Admiral Karim later left the option open, saying that the country had no plans to deploy nuclear weapons on its submarines, and that it would do so only if "forced to".

In 2012, its first headquarters was inaugurated by the Chief of Naval Staff Admiral Asif Sandila with Tanveer Faiz becoming its first commander. The military media command, the ISPR described the NSFC as the "custodian of the nation's 2nd strike capability, will strengthen Pakistan's policy of Credible Minimum Deterrence and ensure regional stability."

References

Military units and formations established in 2004
2004 establishments in Pakistan
Commands of Pakistan Navy
Strategic forces of Pakistan